The Wuluo River, also spelled Wulo River, is a tributary of the Gaoping River in Pingtung County, Taiwan.

The river has long been polluted by untreated domestic and partially treated pig farming wastewater. It is among the most polluted rivers in Taiwan and the most polluted tributary of the Gaoping River. As one mitigation measure, a constructed wetland was established in 2004.

See also
List of rivers in Taiwan

References

Rivers of Taiwan
Landforms of Pingtung County